The Melbourne Railway Company was formed in 1859 to construct and run a railway from Melbourne to Windsor, where it connected with the St Kilda and Brighton Railway. 

Previously, the Brighton line had branched off the end of the St Kilda Railway, requiring a reverse loop. The Melbourne Company line provided a more direct route into the city via Richmond and Princes Bridge. The Melbourne Railway Company purchased the Melbourne and Suburban Railway Company in 1862, and the St Kilda and Brighton Railway Company and was amalgamated with the Melbourne and Hobson's Bay Railway Company to form the Melbourne and Hobson's Bay United Railway Company on 22 October 1864. Subsequently, all these railway businesses were acquired by the government-owned Victorian Railways in 1878.

Rolling stock

Locomotives

References

External links
 Trove List:-Melbourne and Hobson's Bay Railway Company
 Trove List:-Melbourne and Hobson's Bay United Railway Company

Defunct railway companies of Australia
History of Melbourne
Railway companies established in 1862
Railway companies disestablished in 1878
1878 disestablishments in Australia
Australian companies established in 1862